The Georgia Music Hall of Fame was a hall of fame to recognize music performers and music industry professionals from or connected to the state of Georgia. It began with efforts of the state's lieutenant governor Zell Miller to attract the music industry to Georgia. Following the first Georgia Music Week in 1978, the first Georgia Music Hall of Fame Awards were held in 1979, with two inductees.  The hall eventually had 163 inductees; the final inductions were made in 2015.

The Georgia Music Hall of Fame Museum was located in downtown Macon, Georgia, United States, from 1996 until it closed in 2011. The Hall of Fame museum preserved and interpreted the state's musical heritage through programs of collection, exhibition, education, and performance; it attempted to foster an appreciation for Georgia music and tried to stimulate economic growth through a variety of dynamic partnerships and initiatives statewide.  The museum closed due to low attendance and reduced state funding.  Mercer University purchased the former Hall of Fame museum building in June 2012; the university used the building for expanded programs within its School of Medicine.

History
The Georgia Music Hall of Fame's institutional history began in 1978 when the Georgia General Assembly created the Senate Music Recording Industry Committee to study the state's music industry's economic impact and explore ways to promote Georgia music and attract music businesses to the state. In 1979, the Committee developed a Georgia Music Hall of Fame program honoring Georgia musicians who have made significant contributions to the music industry, with Ray Charles and music publisher Bill Lowery named the first inductees on September 26, 1979.

Owing much to the vision of then Lt. Governor Zell Miller, the Committee also endeavored to create a public museum and archive to document the state's music heritage and serve as a cultural heritage destination. In 1990, the Georgia Music Hall of Fame Authority was created as an instrumentality of the State of Georgia and a public corporation with the stated corporate purpose and general nature: 1) to construct and maintain a facility to house the Georgia Music Hall of Fame; 2) to operate, advertise and promote the Georgia Music Hall of Fame; and 3) to promote music events at the facility and throughout the state. On September 22, 1996, the Georgia Music Hall of Fame opened as a  facility housing the main exhibit hall, a retail store, the Zell Miller Center for Georgia Music Studies, an administrative wing, a classroom, and a reception room. In 1999, the second phase of the museum, The Billy Watson Music Factory, an interactive and interpretive exhibit space for pre-K through elementary students, opened.

The hall was closed on June 12, 2011, due to lack of attendance, and the collection was donated to the University of Georgia Special Collections Libraries.  The exhibits are now housed at the University of Georgia, Georgia State University, the University of West Georgia, and in private collections.

Museum

Exhibits 
The Georgia Music Hall of Fame's permanent exhibit space was designed to resemble a Georgia town where venues such as the Jazz and Swing Club, Vintage Vinyl, and Rhythm & Blues Revue house artifacts, interpretive text, and audio-visual elements. Temporary exhibits included "Keeps Calling Me Home: A Gram Parsons Retrospective", "Let Freedom Sing: Music and the Civil Rights Movement" and '"Otis Redding: I've Got Dreams to Remember", named "Museum Exhibition of the Year" in 2008 by the Georgia Association of Museums and Galleries.

Education 
Education was at the core of the Georgia Music Hall of Fame museum's mission. The Billy Watson Music Factory served children in grades pre-K through elementary by encouraging the exploration of musical concepts like rhythm, melody, and composition in a hands-on learning environment. MIKE (Music in Kids' Education) provided a series of programs offering live music performances and music instruction opportunities throughout the year.

Georgia Music magazine
The Georgia Music Hall of Fame Foundation published the quarterly magazine, Georgia Music, from 2005 to 2013 as both the official museum magazine and an in-depth look at Georgia music. The state's legends, landmarks, and unsung heroes were explored through features, historical articles, news, and reviews.

Inductees

See also
 List of music museums

References

External links
Georgia Music Hall & Education Resources
Georgia Music Foundation

Music halls of fame
Halls of fame in Georgia (U.S. state)
State halls of fame in the United States
Music museums in Georgia (U.S. state)
Museums in Macon, Georgia
1979 establishments in Georgia (U.S. state)
2011 disestablishments in Georgia (U.S. state)
Defunct museums in Georgia (U.S. state)
Museums established in 1979
Museums disestablished in 2011